Basicladia is a genus of green algae in the family Pithophoraceae.

References

External links

Cladophorales genera
Pithophoraceae